Delain is a Dutch symphonic metal band formed in 2002 by former Within Temptation keyboardist Martijn Westerholt, intending for the band to be solely a project. Singer Charlotte Wessels was invited to join in 2005. The name of the band comes from the Kingdom of Delain in Stephen King's novel, The Eyes of the Dragon. In February 2021, the members decided to part ways. In June 2021, Westerholt announced that there will be a new lineup involving former and new members.

History

Early years, Lucidity and April Rain (2002–2010)

In 2002, Westerholt formed Delain, after he was forced to leave Within Temptation due to Pfeiffer's disease. In the same year, they independently released the demo Amenity. After the demo, Westerholt temporarily left the project behind but continued to write music.

In 2005, he joined with Charlotte Wessels, and was signed to Roadrunner Records. At the time, the band was envisioned as a musical project featuring a host of guest musicians, and not as a live band.

Lucidity brought to fruition Westerholt's dream of a musical project, featuring many well-known musicians from the metal community: Marko Hietala, Liv Kristine, Ariën van Weesenbeek, Ad Sluijter, George Oosthoek and Guus Eikens, Sharon den Adel and Jan Yrlund.

Despite many delays, Lucidity was released in September 2006, to generally positive reviews. The album spawned three singles: Frozen, See Me In Shadow and The Gathering, and the response to the album allowed Delain to tour in support in the Netherlands and neighbouring countries. Rob van der Loo, Ronald Landa and Sander Zoer were added on bass, guitar and drums respectively to round out the live band.

At the end of 2007, Delain announced that they were working on their second album. New songs from the album – "Stay Forever" and "Start Swimming" – were added to the band's setlist in early 2008. Their second album, April Rain was released on 9 February 2009. The lead single was the title track, "April Rain", followed by "Stay Forever". The band toured extensively in support of the album, visiting many new countries such as the United States and Mexico, as well as performing at high-profile festivals in Europe, including Hellfest, Lowlands, Wacken Open Air and Sonisphere. In February 2010, Delain announced they had started working on their third album, and that bassist Rob van der Loo would leave the band the same year due to time constraints. In March, Otto Schimmelpenninck van der Oije was announced as Rob's successor.
On 4 October 2010, Delain announced they were to part company with guitarist Ewout Pieters. Timo Somers was announced as his replacement on 17 April 2011.

We Are the Others (2011–2013)

During their 2011 live shows, Delain debuted three new songs — "Manson" (later renamed to "Mother Machine"), "Get the Devil Out of Me" and "Milk and Honey" — from their third album, We Are the Others.
In an interview with Sonic Cathedral, Wessels discussed the inspiration she drew from the Sophie Lancaster case:
I remember when I first heard about it … it wasn't on Dutch news, I just heard about it through Internet networks and the goth scene … there was this movie made about it, a short film of about four minutes. I saw it, and I just cried. It's so incredibly sad! After seeing the movie, I didn't really DO anything with it until we were working on "We Are The Others." But the basic idea of the lyrics was there. It was just supposed to be a song about "we are the others" and a feeling of togetherness. On the one hand, being proud of whoever you are, whether you divert from the norm in whatever way you divert from the norm. But on the other hand, it is also kind of a song for "others". We just wanted a song about acceptance.
Originally intended for release in early 2012, the album's release date was unknown due to Warner Music's purchase of Roadrunner Records.  However, it was announced via a Facebook message on the band official page that the album would be released on 1 June 2012 with the album's first single, 'Get the Devil Out of Me' being released on 13 April 2012  via CNR Music, who took over Delain from Warner Music. The second single from the album was the title track, 'We Are the Others'.
It was announced on 3 November that Delain would headline Dames of Darkness Festival (Wolverhampton, UK) which they had previously headlined in 2009 (under the Femme Metal Festival).

On 26 February 2013, Delain announced that they will release a special album entitled Interlude that would include new songs, covers, live tracks, special versions of previous songs and a bonus DVD. It was released on various dates throughout the first week of May worldwide.

The Human Contradiction, Lunar Prelude EP and Moonbathers (2014–2018)

On 23 January 2014, Delain announced that they would release a new album entitled The Human Contradiction. It was released on 5 April 2014 in Europe, and on 8 April 2014 in North America.

On 4 June 2014, it was announced that drummer Sander Zoer would step down from the band due to personal reasons; he would continue working behind the scenes of Delain. The replacement drummer was announced to be Ruben Israel, who had stepped in for Zoer during Delain's tour with Kamelot. Zoer continued to perform until September, until he left for personal reasons and was replaced by Israel.

The band brought with them Merel Bechtold as a second guitarist for their UK tour in November 2014. Bassist Otto Schimmelpenninck van der Oije suffered an injury on 26 November 2014, when he was accidentally hit by a streamer cannon, causing his left testicle to rupture. This incident was said to be caused by uncertain stage positioning, as there were six people onstage instead of the usual five. While he was recovering, the band used pre-recorded bass parts. No permanent damage was done, and as of 12 January 2015, Schimmelpenninck van der Oije has resumed touring.  Merel Bechtold filled in for guitarist Timo Somers until February, due to Somers' full schedule.

Delain toured with Sabaton and Battle Beast, and also North America with Sabaton as support for Nightwish for the first half of 2015 and returned to Latin America during October as support of them. Delain toured as support again for Nightwish's tour on the second North American leg in 2016 with Sonata Arctica. This made it the fourth year in a row the band had toured in the United States and Canada.

On 19 October 2015, Delain made recurring touring guitarist Merel Bechtold a permanent member.

Delain announced an eight track EP of new and live songs named Lunar Prelude. The EP was released on 19 February 2016. Their first single, Suckerpunch, of the EP was released on 5 February.

The band announced a new album of ten original songs and one "Queen" cover named Moonbathers. The record was released on 26 August 2016.

Delain's first live video album, A Decade of Delain: Live at Paradiso was filmed at the Paradiso in Amsterdam, Netherlands for the band's 10th anniversary on 10 December 2016. It was released on 27 October 2017.

On 30 August 2018, Joey de Boer was made a permanent member of Delain after filling in for Ruben Israel, who left the band in October 2017.

Hunter's Moon EP and Apocalypse & Chill (2018–2020)

Delain announced a new EP titled Hunter's Moon on 13 December 2018. The EP was released on 22 February 2019. Masters of Destiny, the first single off of the EP was released on 11 January 2019 along with a music video.

Merel Bechtold announced on 16 June 2019 that she was amicably leaving the band to pursue other musical interests. Her last show with Delain took place at Graspop Metal Meeting on 23 June 2019.

On 27 September 2019, "Burning Bridges", the first single off of the album was released, which made its debut days before during their North America tour. On 15 November 2019, the second single off of the album, "One Second", was released.

The band officially announced the title of their sixth studio album, Apocalypse & Chill, on 29 November 2019. It was released on 7 February 2020.

During the COVID-19 pandemic, the band was nominated by Arch Enemy vocalist Alissa White-Gluz for a benefit livestream concert called Together at Home. Lead singer Charlotte Wessels and guitarist Timo Somers both participated and did an acoustic version of songs and were the final performers of the livestream nominations.

Lineup changes and Dark Waters (2021–present)
On 15 February 2021, it was announced that Delain's lineup had dissolved, and that it would be continuing as a solo project of Westerholt's who stated that he will continue to "keep Delain alive". In the statement, he said: "Delain will live on. The others have chosen to pursue different paths. I have decided to keep Delain alive by continuing on with writing and producing the music for Delain as I always have. I started Delain as a project in 2002 and for the next album I will take it back to a project form, releasing music with special guests. As it looks now many familiar faces will be returning to join me on this journey." In Wessels' statement on her departure, she added that she was moving onto her solo career, but wishing the other members and the fans well: 

On 9 June 2021, Westerholt stated in an interview that the band will not be a solo project but will continue to be a live entity that will consist of new and former members. He continued on to state that there will be a lot of Delain DNA in this new lineup.

It was announced on 28 June 2021 that Sander Zoer who previously was Delain's drummer, had returned as the first member for the new lineup of the band. On 12 July 2021, Delain reintroduced Ronald Landa who was the band's original guitarist up until April Rain, as their guitarist. On 28 February 2022, it was announced that former bassist Rob van der Loo would be featured as a guest musician for the upcoming album. On 19 May 2022, Ludovico Cioffi joined the band as the new bassist. While announcing that they would return to performing shows in November 2022, the band released the new single, "The Quest and the Curse", on 9 August 2022, as well as announcing their new lead vocalist, Diana Leah. The band's new lineup performed for the first time in Aarburg, Switzerland for the Riverside festival on 27 August 2022. The second single, "Beneath", which was performed by the band in Zwolle was released on 29 November 2022. Simultaneously on the same day of the single's release, the band also announced the title of their seventh studio album, Dark Waters, which was released on 10 February 2023. On 10 January 2023, the third single along with a music video in support of it was released for the song, "Moth to a Flame".

To support the release of Dark Waters, the band announced at the end of the year that they would be touring Europe in April and May 2023, with a North American tour in September 2023 with Visions of Atlantis.

Members

Current members
Martijn Westerholt – keyboards (2002, 2005–present)
Sander Zoer – drums (2006–2014, 2021–present)
Ronald Landa – guitars, backing vocals, harsh vocals (2006–2009, 2021–present)
Ludovico Cioffi – bass, backing vocals, harsh vocals (2022–present)
Diana Leah – lead vocals (2022–present)

Former members

Vocalists
Anne Invernizzi – lead vocals (2002)
Charlotte Wessels – lead vocals (2005–2021)

Guitarists
Roy van Enkhuyzen – guitars (2002)
Frank van der Meijden – guitars (2002)
Ray van Lente – guitars (2006–2007)
Ewout Pieters – guitars, backing vocals (2009–2010)
Timo Somers – lead guitar, backing vocals (2011–2021)
Merel Bechtold – rhythm guitar (2015–2019; live 2013, 2014–2015)

Bassists
Martijn Willemsen – bass (2002)
Rob van der Loo – bass (2006–2010; session 2022)
Otto Schimmelpenninck van der Oije – bass, harsh vocals (2010–2021)

Drummers
Tim Kuper – drums (2002)
Ruben Israel – drums (2014–2017; live 2013)
Joey de Boer – drums (2018–2021; live 2017–2018)

Session and live members
Marko Hietala – bass (2006), co-lead vocals (2006, 2009, 2014, 2023)
Rosan van der Aa – backing vocals (2006)
George Oosthoek – harsh vocals (2006, 2009, 2012, 2014)
Ad Sluijter – guitars (2006)
Jan "Örkki" Yrlund – guitars (2006)
Guus Eikens – guitars, backing vocals (2006, 2009, 2012, 2014)
Ariën van Weesenbeek – drums (2006)
Roel Vink – bass (2009)
Bas Maas – guitars (2012)
Alissa White-Gluz – harsh vocals (2014, 2016)
Jan Rechberger – drums (2019)

Timeline

Discography

Studio albums

Live albums

Compilations

EPs

Singles

Music videos
"Frozen" (2007)
"See Me in Shadow" (2007)
"The Gathering" (2008)
"Stay Forever" (2009)
"April Rain" (2009)
"Get the Devil Out of Me" (2012)
"We Are the Others" (2012)
"Are You Done with Me" (2013)
"Stardust" (2014)
"Suckerpunch" (2016)
"Fire with Fire" (live video) (2016)
"Masters of Destiny" (2019)
"Burning Bridges" (2019)
"Ghost House Heart" (2020)
"The Quest and the Curse" (2022)
"Beneath" (2022)
"Moth to a Flame" (2023)
"Queen of Shadow" (2023)

Awards and nominations

References

External links

 Official website
 

2002 establishments in the Netherlands
Dutch gothic metal musical groups
Dutch power metal musical groups
Dutch symphonic metal musical groups
Female-fronted musical groups
Musical groups established in 2002
Musical groups disestablished in 2002
Musical groups reestablished in 2005
Musical quintets
Napalm Records artists